Police Factory is an Indian comedy crime television series, which premiered on 26 September 2015 and is broadcast on SAB TV. The series is produced by DJ's a Creative Unit of Tony Singh. The action comedy show revolves around the story of a police academy based in Mohali, Punjab which is known for producing outstanding police officers. Here, the sincere police officer, Shamsher Devgan proves that he is worthy training anyone be it a stone or a diamond. The story revolves around 7 cadets who are complete misfits for the academy but are still there due to personal reasons and are dedicated to become police officers. Tarun Khanna and Vivana Singh played the male and female lead roles of Shamsher Devgan and Maya Mohan respectively.

Plot
A brave police officer, Shamsher Singh Devgan(Tarun Khanna), challenged by a reporter(Manmohan Tiwari), hired by Devgan's opponent, Inspector Inderjeet Chaddha(Naveen Bawa) to be a chief himself, he wants to ruin Devgan and be a chief of the Police Factory. Hiring some mischiefs, the journey begins.

Cast
Tarun Khanna as Inspector Shamsher Singh Devgan (Main Male lead & protagonist) he is chief of police factory and a disciplined  No-nonsense strict police officer who is known to train some brilliant police officers over the years .He accepted the challenge to train 7 complete misfit cadets to become successful police officers .He deeply cares about all his 7 cadets but does not show them . He is secretly in love with inspector Maya Mohan and mostly agrees with whatever she says. He sometimes refers Maya as Mohini out of love when he daydreams about her. He is Priya's elder brother and is very protective of her and loves her immensely. 
Vivana Singh as Inspector Maya Mohan / Mohini (Main Female lead & protagonist) she is a beautiful, No-nonsense and  disciplined  police officer like Shamsher but is soft toward cadets sometimes unlike Shamsher . She is shown to be biggest support system of Shamsher in police factory as she helps him to prove his innocence twice when he is wrongly accused and  suspended. Other than that, she also help and support him otherwise .she is Shamsher's love interest. and later she also develops feelings for him she is often shown to be at loggerheads with Inspector Indrajeet Chadda .She also has a twin sister Chhaya.
Naveen Bawa as Inspector Indrajeet Chadda (Main lead antagonist) he is a lazy, indisciplined and careless police officer .he is  a big coward and a superstitious person.   he is Shamsher 's opponent . He wants to  ruin Shamsher hence create hurdles for him which he (Shamsher)eventually overcomes. He selects 7 misfit cadets for Shamsher to train. He is often at loggerheads with Inspector Maya due to difference of opinion and because she always takes Shamsher's  side. He is usually seen calling cadets names as all of them do not respect him as much as they respect Shamsher and Maya.
Paras Arora as Cadet Rahul. He is priya's love interest  and enters police factory to win over Shamsher and to seek his permission to marry priya. He considers Shahrukh khan as his idol and imitates him and calls priya "senorita " just like Shahrukh did in DDLJ.he usually end up annoying or upsetting Shamsher because of this behaviour.
Deeksha Sonalkar as Priya Devgan. She is Shamsher's younger sister and Rahul's girlfriend. 
Sonal Vengurlekar as Priya Devgan
Ritesh Mobh as Thief Vicky /Cadet Vicky. He was a small yet intelligent thief who was arrested and brought to police factory  where Shamsher gave him a second chance to start his life afresh and accepted him as his cadet. He is Sheena 's love interest
Shireena Sambyal as Cadet Sheena Dhingra. She belongs to family of police officers and is one of the intelligent and bright cadets . She is Vicky's love interest 
Neha Tomar as Cadet Ruby Srivastav.she hails from Lucknow and speaks pure Urdu due to which people are unable to communicate with her .She is Bundel's love interest.
Akshay Anand Kohli as Cadet Bundel Singh Jaat. He belongs to a don family from Haryana. His catchphrase is " mari Amma ji kehti hai .." he is Ruby's love interest.
Akash Pratap Singh as Cadet Rishi. He belongs to Gujarati family. He aspired to become a doctor but  came to police factory to fulfil last wish of his grandfather to see him become a police officer.
Anurag Singh Thakur as Cadet Bonie D'Costa . He is a theatre actor who came to police factory to prove himself. He has an exceptional talent of mimicry .which he uses to help Shamsher solve the case. 
Manmohan Tiwari as Reporter / Inderjeet Chadda's friend (antagonist)He is indrajeet's puppet who challenged Shamsher to train 7complete misfit cadets.
Vivana Singh as Chhaya ( inspector Maya's twin sister) she came to take revenge from Inspector Maya hence disguise as her when Maya gets kidnapped by scorpion. she realises that Shamsher loves Maya she helps him at the time of her arrest by telling Maya about Shamsher's feelings .
Mrigendra konwar as Jackie Lee in Episode 12

References

External links
SonyLIV.Com Site

2015 Indian television series debuts
Hindi-language television shows
Indian comedy television series
Television shows set in Mumbai
Sony SAB original programming